The Tren Brothers are an Australian instrumental rock duo, consisting of guitarist Mick Turner and drummer Jim White.  Turner and White are two-thirds of the critically acclaimed instrumental rock trio Dirty Three; additionally, Turner also is a solo recording artist working under his own name.

In addition to their own recordings, the duo served as Cat Power's band on her breakthrough album Moon Pix, as well as Will Oldham's band on the Western Music EP.

Discography 

 Singles and EPs
 Tren Brothers EP (Drag City, 1998)
 Kit's Choice/Gone Away 7" (Secretly Canadian, 1998)
 Swing Pts. 1&2 7" (as Tren Brothers & Sister, with Jessica Billey on violin) (Chapter Records, CH34, 2000)
 The Swimmer (Western Vinyl, 2005)
 Tren Brothers/Bridezilla (band) Split 7' Sometimes/Forth & Fine (Inertia (independent record company), 2009)

 Compilations
 Blue Trees, an album compiling out of print, and rare tracks of both Tren Brothers and Mick Turner. (Drag City, 2007)

References 

Australian rock music groups